The Mathewson–Gerecke House in Norfolk, Nebraska was built in 1884.  It was listed on the National Register of Historic Places in 2012.

It is a two-story Queen Anne-style house.  It was remodelled in c.1925, at which time a sunroom on the east side was added, and front and rear porches were replaced with Classical porticos.

It was home of Charles Payson Mathewson (1848-1941), who eventually served as speaker of the House of the state of Nebraska, and served as a bank president, and fled in a scandal, after stealing funds.

It was later home of Herman Gerecke.

References

External links

Houses on the National Register of Historic Places in Nebraska
Queen Anne architecture in Nebraska
Houses completed in 1884
Houses in Madison County, Nebraska
National Register of Historic Places in Madison County, Nebraska